Tony Docherty (born 24 January 1971 in East Kilbride) is a Scottish football player and coach.

Career
Docherty's short career began in 1987 with Dunfermline Athletic before moving to English side Cambridge United. In the early 1990s, Docherty returned to Scotland, having spells with Stirling Albion, East Stirlingshire and Albion Rovers.

During his time with the Coatbridge club, Docherty became SFA Development Officer for the Glasgow area, spending three years there before a move to Falkirk as the Community Coach. Upon Ian McCall's appointment as manager at Brockville, Docherty became assistant manager, and when McCall moved to take charge of Dundee United in early 2003, Docherty came as part of the management team. Following McCall's dismissal and Gordon Chisholm's subsequent appointment, Docherty was promoted to first team coach, a position he held under the successive management spells of Craig Brewster and Craig Levein.

In November 2007, Docherty left Tannadice and moved to Scottish First Division side St Johnstone as assistant manager, working under former United player Derek McInnes. achieving promotion back to the SPL eighteen months later. When McInnes became manager of Bristol City in October 2011, Docherty followed him to Ashton Gate as assistant manager. 

On 25 March 2013 he once again teamed up with Derek McInnes, this time at SPL side Aberdeen. In July 2019 they signed new contracts with Aberdeen that were due to run until 2022, but they left Aberdeen in March 2021. A month later Docherty joined Forfar Athletic to assist caretaker manager Gary Irvine. Docherty teamed up again with Derek McInnes at Kilmarnock in January 2022.

References

1971 births
Aberdeen F.C. non-playing staff
Association football midfielders
Bristol City F.C. non-playing staff
Cambridge United F.C. players
Dundee United F.C. non-playing staff
Dunfermline Athletic F.C. players
East Stirlingshire F.C. players
Albion Rovers F.C. players
Falkirk F.C. non-playing staff
Living people
Sportspeople from East Kilbride
Scottish Football League players
Scottish football managers
Scottish footballers
Footballers from South Lanarkshire
St Johnstone F.C. non-playing staff
Stirling Albion F.C. players
Kilmarnock F.C. non-playing staff